TEMSA Skoda Sabancı Ulaşım Araçları A.Ş.  is a manufacturer of buses, midibuses, and light-trucks. As of 2020, it is operating under the partnership of Sabancı Holding and PPF Group (Škoda Transportation).

At the TEMSA Adana plant, which is established on an area of 500,000 m², a total of 11,500 vehicles are produced annually, including 4,000 buses, midibuses, and 7,500 light trucks, with 1,400 employees.

Some of the TEMSA buses were included in Bus Driver (video game) which was made by SCS Software in 2007.

History 

TEMSA (Termo-Mekanik Sanayi ve Ticaret A.Ş./ Thermo-mechanics Industry and Trade Incorporated) was founded in 1968 by Sabancı Holding to supply steel to the construction industry. Manufacturing of coaches began in 1984 with licensing and distribution agreements from Mitsubishi Motors. Service bus products were introduced in 1987.

The products have their own bodywork and include Mitsubishi Fuso, MAN, DAF, Cummins and Caterpillar engines and parts that meet the European emission standards (Euro4, Euro5).

Since 2000, a full range of coaches has been developed for Western European markets, utilizing MAN engines and axles and ZF transmissions. TEMSA became independent and flexible in using different engines with its own developments and started carrying out tailor-made production. A subsidiary, TEMSA Europe, has been established in Belgium and several rep offices have been established in 46 different countries of the world (Germany, France, Italy, Spain,...), under the management of Temsa Europe. Temsa has obtained over 7% of market share in its segment in Europe. Of the 1000 buses produced every year, 75% are exported.

Temsa is represented by three models in the US. The TS 30, TS 35 and TS 45 are motor coaches of 30, 35 and 45 ft respectively.

TEMSA AR-GE ve Teknoloji Merkezi (Temsa Research & Development Center) is a branch of TEMSA that is responsible of new vehicle production and technology development. In June 2019, TEMSA was purchased by True Value Capital Partners of Switzerland.
In February 2020, Sabanci Holdings and Škoda Transportation have agreed and signed a letter of intent to become the new joint owners of Temsa.

Product Line  

Temsa main markets are divided as Turkish (domestic), Europe, USA and Non-Europe. Most domestic vehicles from Temsa are sold in export markets with or without domestic model names as well.

Domestic market (Turkey) 

Coach
 Maraton
Safir Plus

Midi Coach
 Opalin
 Prestij SX

Inter City
LD SB Plus
MD9 LE

City
 Avenue LF
 Avenue LF CNG
Avenue Electron
Avenue EV
MD9 ElectriCITY
Prestij City SX

Van
 Maxus (licensed Maxus V80)

Export markets 

Coach
 TS45
 Maraton
HD
HD RHD
HD C12
LD
TS35

Midi Coach
 TS30
MD9
MD9 RHD
MD7 Plus
Prestij SX

Inter City
 LD SB Plus
MD9 LE

City
LF12
LF12 CNG
Avenue Electron
LF EV
MD9 ElectriCITY

Light truck 

 Mitsubishi Fuso Canter (1988 - )

Gallery

References

External links 

 TEMSA International website
 Temsa Global Corporate website
 Temsa Safir Plus Bus

Bus manufacturers of Turkey
Vehicle manufacturing companies established in 1968
Turkish brands
Sabancı family
1968 establishments in Turkey